Rudolf Schmid may refer to:

 Rudolf Schmid (bishop) (1914–2012), German prelate of the Roman Catholic Church
 Rudolf Schmid (bobsleigh) (born 1945), Swiss Olympic bobsledder
 Rudolf Schmid (luger) (1951–2014), former luger from Austria

See also
 Rudolf Schmidt (disambiguation)